Sherman Davis was a professional baseball third baseman in the Negro leagues. He played with the Detroit Stars in 1925.

References

External links
 and Seamheads

Detroit Stars players
Year of birth missing
Year of death missing
Baseball third basemen